The Bleeders was a self-titled re-release/repackaging of the Bleeders 2003 EP A Bleeding Heart, and the later double A-side single release of "All that Glitters"/"So Lonely" by New Zealand band the Bleeders, released in 2005. It was released almost exclusively in Australia where the other releases were not available.

Track listing
"All That Glitters"
"So Lonely"
"Family"
"Cast in the Shadows"
"Sell Out"
"It's Black"
"Channelling"
"A Bleeding Heart"

Bleeders albums
2005 albums